Team SoloMid (TSM) is a professional esports organization based in the United States. It was founded in September 2009 by Andy "Reginald" Dinh. TSM currently fields players in League of Legends, Dota 2, Apex Legends, Valorant, Hearthstone, Super Smash Bros., Fortnite, PUBG Mobile, Battlegrounds Mobile India, Tom Clancy's Rainbow Six Siege, Magic: The Gathering Arena, and chess. The organization previously had a Counter-Strike: Global Offensive team based in Denmark that later became Astralis and also briefly owned an Overwatch team.

TSM's League of Legends team has won seven of the total sixteen splits of North America's League of Legends Championship Series (LCS).

Etymology 
The name SoloMid refers to a strategy in League of Legends where a single player (solo) would attack the middle lane (mid).

History 

Team SoloMid was founded by Andy "Reginald" Dinh in September 2009 as a League of Legends community website and playing guide resource. In 2011, the organization began fielding a team in professional LoL competitions. The original roster consisted of Reginald, SaintVicious, Chaox, TheOddOne, and Locodoco. Reginald retired from competitive play at the end of 2013, opting to run the business full-time.

On December 21, 2014, a group of gray hat hackers known as Null Consolidated claimed to have hacked into the SoloMid.net servers. The hackers vandalized the community website by replacing it with obscene imagery. They also claimed to have obtained thousands of user account data, but said they would not be releasing any of it.

On January 24, 2015, TSM acquired the Counter-Strike: Global Offensive roster of Team Dignitas. The Daily Dot reported that following their signing, the players became the highest paid CS:GO players in the world at the time.

On March 14, 2015, TSM's League of Legends team won their first Intel Extreme Masters World Championship in Katowice, Poland.

On April 12, 2015, TSM signed Super Smash Bros. Melee player Leffen as their first fighting game player.

On August 1, 2015, TSM announced the signing of ZeRo to their Super Smash Bros. division. ZeRo would go on to achieve 56 straight tournament wins in Super Smash Bros. for Wii U, a feat recorded in the Guinness World Records. On January 12, 2018, ZeRo announced his retirement from the Super Smash Bros. competitive scene due to his lack of motivation to go further with his career, and on November 8, 2018, TSM announced that ZeRo had departed from the team.

On June 16, 2019, TSM acquired the former roster of the Rainbow Six Siege Pro League team Excelerate Gaming along with popular streamer, Jason "Beaulo" Doty. They started competition in the Pro League in Season 10 the same day.

On May 22, 2020, TSM announced their move into the Valorant scene, with their first official roster consisting of Hazed, Drone, Wardell, Cutler, and Subroza. According to Subroza, the transition for most players on the team was easy coming from a CSGO background.

On August 27, 2020, TSM announced their signing of chess Grandmaster Hikaru Nakamura. Nakamura is the second chess player to be sponsored by an esports organization.

In December 2020, Team SoloMid was worth $410 million. The same month the revenue of Team SoloMid was estimated $45 million.

On June 4, 2021, TSM announced a 10-year $210 million naming rights deal with Bahamas-based cryptocurrency exchange FTX, officially changing their name to Team SoloMid FTX. Also in June 2021, Erik Marino, co-founder of the brand Rocksmith, joined TSM as vice president of apparel.

On January 26, 2022, TSM announced on their Twitter page that they will acquire Team Undying's roster and will venture into the DotA 2 scene. Team Undying consisted of Timado, Bryle, SabeRLight-, MoonMeander and DuBu, and currently competing in the NA region. They won the Dota Pro Circuit NA 2021/2022 Tour 1 Regional finals against Evil Geniuses.

In late 2021, several employees and players of TSM publicly accused Reginald of workplace bullying, including verbal abuse; similar accusations had arisen as early as 2011. TSM and Riot Games, the game developer of League of Legends, both launched their own investigations into the accusations as a result.  Following the investigations, Riot Games found Dinh guilty of disparaging and bullying behavior and TSM was fined $75,000, with Dinh being ordered to complete sensitivity and executive training. TSM meanwhile found that their CEO had committed "no unlawful conduct".

On November 16, 2022, TSM announced they had dropped the "FTX" branding and ended their agreement with FTX early after FTX declared bankruptcy amid scandal.

Current divisions

League of Legends

History

Season 1 
Team SoloMid first began competing in early 2011 with a lineup of Saintvicious, Reginald, Chaox, TheOddOne, and Locodoco. The team was founded after Reginald's previous team, All or Nothing (AoN), had disbanded. On February 23 Saintvicious left TSM for Counter Logic Gaming. In April, Xpecial and The Rain Man joined TSM.

The final roster for Season 1 included the players, Reginald, TheOddOne, The Rain Man, Xpecial and Chaox. TSM attended the Season 1 World Championship on June 20, 2011. TSM took first place in their group, finishing 2–1, and was the only team to lose to the Singaporean team Xan. Team SoloMid then met the French team, against All authority, in the semifinals of the double elimination playoffs. TSM was defeated by aAa 1–2 and knocked down to the loser's bracket. TSM defeated Epik Gamer 2–0 and advanced to the loser bracket finals, where they faced against All authority for a second time. aAa started the best-of-three series with a one-game advantage due to their previous win against TSM in the winner's bracket, and they defeated TSM in a close match. Team SoloMid finished in 3rd place, and winning 10,000.

Pre-Season 2 
Team SoloMid attended the National ESL Premier League Season 1 playoffs on July 16, 2011. In the group stage, Team SoloMid took first place, winning 10–1 and defeating Counter Logic Gaming, compLexity, unRestricted, Team Liquid, HKEGG,  and friends, Defy All Odds, OGODBEARS, Disciples of Da Gr8 Whale Lord, and LowELO, while dropping their only set against Rock Solid. In the playoffs of NESL Season 1, Team SoloMid lost to unRestricted in the semifinals 0–2, sending them to the third place match to play against Rock Solid, where Team SoloMid won 2–0.

The team participated in the ESL Major Series – Season VIII and defeated LowLandLions 2–1 in the semifinals, but lost to SK Gaming 0–2 in the finals, achieving second place.

On August 21, 2011, Team SoloMid attended the IEM Season VI – Global Challenge Cologne. They won 3–0 in the group stage, defeating Millenium, Team ALTERNATE and MyRevenge. During the playoffs, they defeated FnaticRC 2–1. At the grand finals, TSM played against Counter Logic Gaming, but lost 1–2 against them and taking second place at IEM Cologne.

Team SoloMid attended the 2011 MLG Pro Circuit – Raleigh on August 26, 2011. At the event, Team SoloMid finished third place in the group stage, with a final standing of 1–2, defeating Curse Gaming but losing to Counter Logic Gaming and Epik Gamer.

On October 9, 2011, the team participated in the IGN ProLeague Season 3 in Atlantic City. TSM won against compLexity 2–0 in the first round, but lost to Epik Gamer 1–2 in the semifinals, sending them to play for third place. In the third place match, Team SoloMid faced Counter Logic Gaming and lost 0–2, ending with fourth place.

Four days later, Team SoloMid participated in the offline IEM Season VI – Global Challenge New York. Team SoloMid finished in 7th–8th place and with a final standing of 0–3 in the group stages, losing to FnaticRC, Counter Logic Gaming and Team Dignitas.

In late October 2011, Team SoloMid moved into a gaming house in Lindenhurst, New York.

Team SoloMid took part in the 2011 MLG Providence tournament, which was held from 19th to the 20th if November. TSM won the first round against RFLX Gaming 2–0 and advanced to the second round, where they lost 1–2, to Epik Gamer. TSM advanced through the Loser's Bracket with a 2–0 victory over Dignitas and played against Epik Gamer in the grand finals. Due to Major League Gaming's extended series rule, Epik Gamer started off with a 2–1 lead against TSM. Team SoloMid won 4–2 over Epik Gamer and achieved first place.

Season 2 
On December 18, 2011, Team SoloMid attended the National ESL Premier League Season 2. In the playoffs and won against RFLX 2–1, compLexity 2–1, and v8 Esports 2–1, placing them in the winner's bracket final, where they lost to Counter Logic Gaming 0–2. Team SoloMid then lost to Curse Gaming 0–2, placing TSM in third overall in the tournament.

The first tournament in 2012 that Team SoloMid attended was the IEM Season VI – Global Challenge Kiev, held on January 19. In the group stage, Team SoloMid won 3–0 and took first, winning against SK Gaming, Curse Gaming, and White Lotus. At the playoffs, Team SoloMid defeated team Dignitas 2–0, qualifying for the finals where they faced Moscow Five. In the grand finals, Team SoloMid lost to Moscow Five 1–2 and placed second place.

Two months after Kiev, on March 13, 2012, TheRainMan resigned from Team SoloMid, citing differences in training regimen plans, as TheRainMan wanted to focus more on solo queue while the rest of Team SoloMid wanted to focus on full team scrims. On the same day TSM announced that, Epik Gamer's Dyrus was picked to replace TheRainMan.  The main reason for the acquisition of Dyrus was due to him living in the TSM house and also being a top lane player.

After the roster reformation, Team SoloMid played in the Leaguecraft  tournament, which ran from March 17 to April 1. At the event, Team SoloMid went undefeated with wins over Raise Your Weapon, Curse Gaming, Jpak and Friends and 4Not.Fire, resulting in them placing first place.

On April 6, 2012, Team SoloMid attended IPL 4 in Las Vegas. During the playoffs they defeated v8 Esports 2–0 in the first round, Curse Gaming 2–0 in the second round and team Dignitas 2–1 in the third round, advancing to the grand finals. In the finals against Counter Logic Gaming, Team SoloMid lost the first set 0–2 but won the second set, defeating Counter Logic Gaming 2–0 and achieving first place in the tournament.

On June 3, 2012, Team SoloMid placed 1st in the Reign of Gaming International Invitational. During the online playoffs, TSM defeated Ordinance Gaming 2–0 in the first round, Orbit Gaming 2–0 in the second round and Team Legion 2–0 in the third round and qualified for the finals. In the round robin offline finals event, Team SoloMid won all the matches, against Team SoloMid Evo, Teamless, and Curse Gaming EU 2–0. In the grand finals, Team SoloMid took on Team SoloMid Evo, whom TSM defeated 2–1.

They participated in the 2012 MLG Pro Circuit – Spring and placed first. Team SoloMid won the entire set of matches in the playoffs of the tournament, winning against MRN 2–0, Counter Logic Gaming EU 2–1, FnaticRC 2–0 and Dignitas 2–0. In the grand finals, Team SoloMid played against Counter Logic Gaming and lost, with Counter Logic Gaming picking up the first set 2–1. Team SoloMid recovered in the second set and won against Counter Logic Gaming 2–1.

Team SoloMid participated in the GIGABYTE Esports LAN on June 15, 2012. In the group stage, TSM won 3–0 against, Counter Logic Gaming Black, Curse Gaming, and Team Green Forest. During the playoffs, Team SoloMid won against  2–0 and Counter Logic Gaming Prime 2–1. In the grand finals of the GESL, Team SoloMid faced off against and defeated Counter Logic Gaming Black 2–0 achieving first place.

From August 3 to 5, 2012, Team SoloMid participated in the first MLG 2012 Summer Arena for League of Legends, held in New York City. They would play against three teams: Curse Gaming, Azubu Blaze, and Team BLACK. Team SoloMid lost all three games against the Korean team Azubu Blaze. They won their next two matches against Curse Gaming and Team BLACK with 3–0. After Qualifying for the Grand Finals, they matched against Azubu Blaze and lost 0–2. They finished the MLG Summer Arena Championship in second place.

The team participated in the IPL Face Off: San Francisco Showdown. Where they won the tournament without a loss to any team, defeating Orbit Gaming, Singapore Sentinels, Team Legion and Curse Gaming.

On August 30, 2012, Team SoloMid played a tournament in Seattle, Washington and competed in the Season 2 North American Regional Finals. During the quarterfinals of the playoffs, Team SoloMid won against Monomaniac Ferus 2–0 and advanced to the next round of the tournament. At the semifinals, Team SoloMid won 2–1 over Curse Gaming and 2–0 against Team Dignitas in the grand finals, allowing them to take first place and qualify for the Season 2 World Championship.

At the Season 2 World Championship in Los Angeles, Team SoloMid passed through the group stage through securing a regional first place. They lost 2–0 to Azubu Frost in the quarterfinals and finished in 5th–8th place, acquiring a prize of $75,000.

Season 3
Team Solo Mid attended IPL 5 in Las Vegas on November 29. Placing in group C, TSM advanced 2–1 with wins over Meat Playground and Singapore Sentinels while losing a game against Curse Gaming EU. During the group stages, TSM was eliminated after losing 2–0 to both CLG EU and Azubu Blaze. TSM ranked 9th–12th at the event and received $1,500.

On February 7, 2013, it was announced that Team SoloMid would compete under the name Team SoloMid Snapdragon on behalf of the mobile processor brand of their sponsor, Qualcomm. Also announced was a partnership with Qualcomm and CBS to produce a web reality series, GameCrib, showing the daily lives of TSM players.

On March 25, 2013, it was officially announced that WildTurtle had replaced Chaox as Team SoloMid's AD Carry.

TSM managed to place in first during the NA LCS Spring Season, securing their spot in the Summer Season. The team also won the NA LCS Spring Playoffs.

At the NA LCS Summer Season TSM placed 3rd and ended the season with a .500 record of 14–14.  At the PAX 2013 playoffs, TSM played against Cloud9 and lost 0–3 in the finals.

At the Season 3 World Championship, TSM was paired with GamingGear.eu of the CIS, Lemondogs of Europe, and OMG of China in the group stage. Team SoloMid won only two matches out of eight, against Lemondogs and GamingGear.eu, placing TSM 11th–12th overall.

Season 4
On October 20, 2013, it was announced that Ninjaken would join Team SoloMid as substitute. The next day TSM announced that Dan Dinh and wingsofdeathx would no longer be substitutes for the team.

On November 1, 2013, Team SoloMid announced Altec as a substitute. The following day, Reginald stepped down from his role as mid laner to become coach and was replaced by Ninjas in Pyjamas's Bjergsen.

Team SoloMid's first competition after the World Championship was the Battle of the Atlantic, in which North American teams competed against European teams. As the second seed of North America, TSM faced the second seed of Europe, Lemondogs, and handily won 2–0 against their new roster, which had recently been completely replaced.

TSM placed in second during the Spring season, and in playoffs, TSM advanced to the finals but were again defeated by Cloud9 (C9), losing 0–3.

In early May, between the Spring and Summer splits of the LCS, TheOddOne stepped down from the starting roster, but remained with TSM as a coach. Amazing, from the Copenhagen Wolves, joined the team as their new jungler, while support player Xpecial was benched and then subsequently released.  Xpecial moved to Team Curse and was replaced by Gleebglarbu from the challenger team Cloud9 Tempest.

On May 27, four days after the start of the Summer Split, TSM announced the addition of Lustboy to the starting roster to replace Gleebglarbu., TSM finished the split in third place with a 16–12 record.

During the summer playoffs at Pax Prime 2014, TSM lost their first match against Dignitas, but the team was able to win the series 3–1. TSM then faced LMQ and won 3–2, thus making it through to the finals against Cloud9 and this time, winning the series 3–2, and also breaking C9's streak of 11 consecutive playoff wins.

At the 2014 League of Legends World Championship, Team SoloMid was drawn into Group B, alongside China's Starhorn Royal Club, Europe's SK Gaming, and Taiwan's Taipei Assassins. TSM finished second in their group with a 4–2 record, and advanced to the knockout stage, for the first and last time in their organization's history. In the playoffs, TSM faced Samsung White in their first match and lost 3–1, placing 5–8th in the tournament.

Season 5

On October 11, 2014, it was announced that Amazing would be leaving the team to return to Europe to play for Origen. Three days later, Gleebglarbu also announced that was also leaving the team. On November 28, 2014, Santorin was signed as the new starting jungle.

In March 2015, Team SoloMid won the Intel Extreme Masters in Katowice after beating Team WE in the finals. This was their first IEM title, as well as their first international tournament win. TSM placed first in the Spring split with a record of 13–5, and once again faced off against Cloud9 in the finals of the LCS Spring playoffs, winning 3–1. It was the third consecutive LCS final that featured the two teams. By winning the LCS Spring playoffs, TSM was one of six teams to qualify for the inaugural Mid-Season Invitational, which was held from the May 7 to 10. TSM lost 5 of their 6 games in the group stage and did not qualify for the quarter finals.

In the summer split, TSM finished 5th place in the regular season at 11–7. In the playoffs, they were able to make their way through bracket to the summer finals at Madison Square Garden in New York, but were defeated 3–0 by Counter Logic Gaming. The team qualified as North America's second seed in the 2015 League of Legends World Championship by accumulating the highest total championship points from both the spring and summer split. In the group stages, TSM went 1–5 in their matches and finished last place in their group, and 14th–16th overall.

Shortly afterward their defeat at Worlds, TSM players Dyrus and Lustboy retired from professional League of Legends, choosing to pursue different career paths within eSports. Lustboy remained with the team as an analyst, and Dyrus remained as a streamer.

Season 6 

Going into Season 6, Bjergsen was left as the sole remaining member from the previous year, as TSM overhauled their roster.  CLG's star AD carry player, Yiliang "Doublelift" Peng, joined the team, replacing WildTurtle wholeft for Immortals, a new team to the LCS. The team would later obtain jungler Svenskeren, top laner Hauntzer, and support KaSing to complete the new roster. This team performed in the Intel Extreme Masters Season X - San Jose and finished 4th. After the event, KaSing decided to leave the team,  and YellOwStaR (Bora Kim) from Fnatic replaced him.

Team SoloMid finished the Spring Split regular season with a 9–9 record, tying for 5th place with NRG Esports and qualifying them for the playoffs. TSM won their first match of the playoffs against Cloud9 3–1, then took down Immortals 3–0 in semi's. In the finals, TSM again faced off against Counter Logic Gaming, but once again lost, this time 3–2.

Prior to the summer split, YellOwStaR left TSM to return to Fnatic. TSM replaced him with a rookie, Biofrost, to fill the support role. During the summer split, TSM lost only a single game against Phoenix1, ending with a 17–1 record. In the playoffs, they defeated CLG 3–0 in a rematch of the Spring finals, and went on to face C9 in the finals, the 5th time the two teams met in the LCS finals. TSM took the game 3–1 to win the Summer Championship.

TSM qualified for the 2016 League of Legends World Championships as North America's first seed. TSM was drawn into Group D, alongside Samsung Galaxy from Korea, RNG of China, and Europe's Splyce. TSM lost their first game against RNG, but were able to win their first games against Samsung and Splyce putting them in a three-way tie for first with Samsung and RNG. In the second week, Samsung beat TSM in a close match where Doublelift's Lucian died to the opposing mid lane Viktor in a clutch moment, which led to TSM failing to take the baron. TSM then won against Splyce but lost to RNG. They were eliminated in the group stage with a 3–3 record.

Season 7 
During the preseason, TSM's starting ADC, Doublelift, announced that he would be taking the Spring Split off in order to rest and build his streaming career. The team's previous ADC, WildTurtle, who had previously moved to Immortals, returned to play with TSM for the Spring Split. Doublelift would later return to the team for the Summer Split after a brief tenure on Team Liquid.

TSM ended the Spring split with a record of 15–3 and qualified for the six-team playoffs. In the playoffs, they defeated 5th seed FlyQuest 3–0 in the semifinals, and in the title match, TSM faced off against their longtime rivals and second seeded Cloud9 once again. TSM defeated Cloud9 in a close 3–2 series to win their 5th championship.

As a result of winning the spring split, TSM was invited to the 2017 Mid Seasonal Invitational in Brazil. At the 2017 Mid Seasonal Invitational, TSM played against the Vietnamese team Gigabyte Marines (GAM) and won 3–2 qualifying for the main event, but once there they ended the group stage with a 4–6 record, placing fifth and failing to make it to the knockout stage.

After Doublelift's return to the team, TSM ended the Summer Split with a record of 14–4, slightly edging out Immortals for first place. In the playoffs, TSM won against Team Dignitas 3–1, and defeated Immortals 3–1 in the finals, winning their third consecutive NA LCS title, and 6th overall.

As LCS Champions, TSM represented North America as the first seed at the 2017 League of Legends World Championship. TSM was drawn inti Group D along with China's Team WE, Europe's Misfits Gaming, and Flash Wolves from Taiwan, in what was considered a very favorable group for TSM. The team ended their first week with a 2–1 record, only losing a match to Misfits. However, in Week 2, TSM went 1–2, losing to both Flash Wolves and WE. With a 3–3 record, TSM were unable to advance, and were eliminated from the World Championship in the group stage, finishing 9th–12th once again.

Season 8 
After three consecutive years of being unable to advance past the group stage, TSM dismissed Svenskeren, Doublelift, and Biofrost, as well as their coach, Parth Naidu. SSONG took over as head coach, although Parth stayed with the organization.  On November 23 and 24, MikeYeung, Zven, and Mithy were signed and replaced the missing slots for the Jungle, AD Carry, and Support positions respectively.

TSM ended the Spring Split regular season with a record of 11–7. After winning tiebreakers against Clutch Gaming and Team Liquid, they qualified for the Spring Split playoffs as the 3rd seed. TSM lost their first match in the quarterfinals against Clutch Gaming with a score of 3–2, ending their Spring Split playoff run early.

In the Summer Split, TSM would play tiebreakers after ending the regular season with a 10–8 record. They lost their initial tiebreaker game against Echo Fox before winning against FlyQuest, which put them in the Summer playoffs as the 5th seed. TSM played Echo Fox again in their quarterfinals match, and won 3–1. In the semifinals, TSM met up with long time rivals Cloud9, the first time the two teams has met in the playoffs outside of the finals. TSM lost the match, 3–2, although they did beat 100 Thieves 3–2 in the third place match.

TSM was placed into the Regional Gauntlet as the 2nd seed, to decide who would be North America's third and final qualifier for the 2018 League of Legends World Championship. TSM defeated Echo Fox 3–0 in the first match of the Gauntlet, then faced off against Cloud9 once again, this time in the Gauntlet finals. C9 3–0'd TSM, ending their run and for the first time ever, TSM failed to qualify for the World Championship.

Season 9 
Following their defeat in the Gauntlet, TSM again made major roster changes for Season 9; Hauntzer left the team after three years as their toplaner, as did new additions MikeYeung and Mithy, the latter separating from his long time bot lane partner Zven, who remained on the team, along with midlaner Bjergsen. Head coach SSONG was also demoted, and replaced by Lustoboy. As replacements, TSM brought in rival Cloud9's support, Smoothie, as well as toplaner BrokenBlade from Turkey, and also Grig as their jungler. During the Spring Split regular season, TSM finished 13–5, in third place. TSM was matched up against Echo Fox in the quarterfinanals, and won 3–1, before meeting Cloud9 in the quarterfinals. After losing the first 2 games, TSM made a comeback and reverse swept C9, advancing to the Spring Finals against Team Liquid. TSM took an early 2–0 in the finals, but then were in turn, reverse swept by Team Liquid, losing 3–2.

During the Summer Split, TSM switched junglers several times between Akaadian, Grig, and rookie Spica, with Spica being the eventual choice for the Summer playoffs. TSM went 10–8 in summer, finishing 5th overall. In the playoffs, TSM lost to Clutch Gaming 3–1 in their first match, exiting the playoffs early, but were still eligible for the Regional Gauntlet, preserving their chance to qualify for the 2019 World Championship, only needing to win one series. Their opponent turned out to be Clutch Gaming, who once again defeated TSM, this time 3–2, causing them to miss out on Worlds once again.

Season 10 
During the 2020 off-season, TSM dropped Zven and Smoothie, picking up Splyce's AD Carry Kobbe, and Biofrost, who rejoined the team.  The team also added Dardoch previously from OpTic Gaming, to be their starting jungler. TSM dropped their Head Coach, Zikz, who left to become the head coach of 100 Thieves. TSM's new roster then went to Shanghai to bootcamp in preparation for the 2020 LCS season.

TSM placed 5th in the regular season of 2020 Spring, with a 9–9 record. In the playoffs, due to the new double-elimination format, as well as TSM's 5th-place finish, they were seeded into the losers bracket. They defeated 100 Thieves 3–2 in their first game, but then fell to FlyQuest 3–1 for a fourth-place finish. After Spring Split, TSM dismissed their AD Carry player Kobbe and jungler Dardoch. Doublelift rejoined TSM from Team Liquid as AD Carry, reuniting with Biofrost in TSM's botlane. They also promoted Spica from their Academy team to the starting roster to replace Dardoch. During the Summer Split regular season, TSM tied for 3rd place with FlyQuest with a 12–6 record, and despite an early 3–0 loss to Golden Guardians, they were not eliminated due to double elimination. TSM won their first game in the losers bracket against Dignitas, 3–0, and then managed to narrowly win the rematch with Golden Guardians, reverse sweeping them 3–2. TSM went on to beat Cloud9 3–1, Team Liquid 3–2, and eventually took a 3–2 victory in the finals over FlyQuest to win the Summer Split. This victory also guaranteed TSM a first seed slot at the World Championship, ensuring they wouldn't have to face the other top seeded teams from other major regions in the initial group rounds.

For the main event group stage of the 2020 World Championship, TSM was placed into Group C with Europe's Fnatic, Korea's Gen.G and China's LGD Gaming. In the group stage, TSM failed to win even a single game, and looked non-competitive in most of their matches, finishing with an 0–6 record. It was the first time that the first seed of a major region went winless at the World Championship.

Season 11 
TSM's roster once again went through substantial revision between 2020 and 2021, which resulted in only jungler Spica maintaining his position for the 2021 season. Bjergsen announced his retirement from professional play on October 24, 2020, and instead moved to the head coach position for the 2021 season.  Toplaner BrokenBlade left for FC Schalke 04 Esports in the LEC, and support Biofrost was dismissed. Huni was signed as the new toplaner and Tristan "PowerOfEvil" Schrage became the new midlaner after their previous contracts with Evil Geniuses and Flyquest, respectively, expired. Most notably, TSM also signed a "record-breaking" contract with their new support SwordArt (Hu Shuo-Chieh), formerly of 2020 Worlds finalist team Suning Gaming and frequent All-Star event attendee, for 6 million dollars over two years. In November 25, approximately a month after Bjergsen's announcement, Doublelift decided to follow Bjergsen into retirement.  TSM Academy bottom laner Lawrence "Lost" Hui was promoted to replace him. While in 2020 such a move would not have been possible due to a two import per team maximum and Lost being a New Zealander, Riot disbanded the Oceanic Pro League (OPL) at the end of 2020, and made all OPL players eligible to participate in the LCS as natives. As such, Lost did not take an import slot.

During the new pre-season "Lock-in" tournament that started the 2021 season, TSM went 2–2 in the group stage, before being eliminated 2–1 in the quarterfinals by Cloud9.

In the spring split, TSM went 12–6 in the regular season, placing them 2nd overall. In the playoffs, they fell to Team Liquid 3–1 in the quarterfinals, dropping them to the losers bracket. They faced off against 100 Thieves, prevailing 3–1 before losing 3–1 in the rematch with TL in the losers bracket finals.

In the summer split, TSM finished the regular season in first place with a 30–15 record, which carried over from spring. In the playoffs, they lost their first game to Team Liquid 3–1, but defeated Immortals in the losers bracket 3–1. In the losers bracket semifinals, they faced Cloud9, with the winner automatically qualifying for the 2020 World Championship, but lost 3–2, and missed Worlds for the third time in four years.

Rosters 

Main

Academy

Achievements

League
 League of Legends Championship Series (LCS)
Winners (7): 2013 Spring, 2014 Summer, 2015 Spring, 2016 Summer, 2017 Spring, 2017 Summer, 2020 Summer

International achievements
 2015 Intel Extreme Masters Season IX – Katowice — 1st
 2017 Rift Rivals (NA vs EU) — 1st

PUBG Mobile / BGMI 
Team SoloMid announced on March 6, 2020, that it had entered the Indian esports scene by partnering with the Indian PUBG Mobile team, Entity Gaming. Entity, which won the 2019 PUBG Mobile Club Open (PMCO) Asia Fall and later placed fifth in the global finals, was renamed TSM Entity (TSMxENT) following the partnership announcement.

TSM officially released this lineup on July 22, 2021, ending their partnership with Entity Gaming in the Indian region.

Team SoloMid signed the former PUBG Mobile Roster of Stalwart Esports on July 30, 2021, as their Battlegrounds Mobile India (Indian version of PUBG Mobile) roster.

Roster

Tom Clancy's Rainbow Six Siege 
Team SoloMid acquired a Rainbow Six Siege team on June 16, 2019, the day before the beginning of Pro League Season 10. The original roster consisted of Matthew "Achieved" Solomon, Khalil "b1ologic" Pleas, Jason "Beaulo" Doty, Tommy "Krusher" Samuel, Bryan "Merc" Wrzek, and Owen "Pojoman" Matura as coach. In early July, it was announced would compete in Dreamhack Valencia 2019 where they would defeat Team Reciprocity and Team One Esports while being eliminated by top European team, Looking For Org, in the quarter finals. From the middle of July to August, Pojoman played in place of Krusher citing confidence issues from the latter. With Pojoman playing, TSM qualified for the Six Major Raleigh 2019 through the North American online qualifier and placed 5–8th in the main event, defeating MiBR and PET Nora-Rengo losing only to Team Empire, the eventual champions, and G2 Esports, the world champions.

On August 24, less than a week after the Major, b1ologic stepped down from the team for personal reasons. To replace him and Krusher, Pojoman moved to a player role and his former teammate from SK Gaming and DarkZero Esports, Sam "Jarvis" Jarvis joined. To replace Pojoman as a player, the former coach of Evil Geniuses, Aaron "Gotcha" Chung joined. This new roster would compete in Dreamhack Montreal 2019 on September 6–8. In Dreamack Montreal, TSM defeated both top Brazilian team FaZe Clan and mixed American-European Susquehanna Soniqs during the group stage. In the playoffs, TSM defeated fellow North Americans, Rogue, top French team BDS Esport, and another top Brazilian team of Team Liquid during the grand final. This victory guaranteed a place in the Six Invitational 2020, the Rainbow Six Siege world championship. In North American Pro League Season 10, TSM placed 6th, narrowly avoiding relegation after defeating top teams such as Rogue and Spacestation Gaming.

On November 25, Gotcha returned to Evil Geniuses as a player, and Jarvis was replaced by another member of EG, Emilio Leynez "Geometrics" Cuevas. At the 2020 Six Invitational (SI), TSM came 3rd losing 0:2 to Ninjas In Pyjamas in the Lower Bracket Finals.

On June 3, Pojoman stepped down as a player to become the team's new head coach, being replaced by Brady "Chala" Davenport on July 27, who transferred from SpaceStation Gaming.  Due to the 2020 COVID-19 pandemic, the Six November 2020 Major was cancelled and was divided into separate regional events. North America was one such region which TSM played and came 1st, beating SpaceStation Gaming 3:1 in the Grand Finals. Following this regional major win, the team achieved another 1st, beating DarkZero 3:1 in the NAL 2020 US Division finals, ahead of 2021 SI. On May 11, the 2021 Six Invitational took place in Paris where TSM took 1st place in the group state, but where knocked out of the tournament by Team Liquid in the Lower Bracket Semi-final, earning them 4th place.

For the rest of 2021, TSM results were lacklustre, coming 2nd, 13th-15th, and 5th in their next three tournaments. This meant in order to compete in the 2022 Six Invitational world championship, they had to win the North American Closed Qualifiers, which they did, beating Parabellum Esports 3:0 in the Grand Final. On February 8 in Stockholm Sweden, the 2022 SI group stage started, with TSM coming 3rd in group C, granting them a place in the playoffs with their first match against Ninjas in Pyjamas, the team that beat them in 2020 SI. This time TSM won 2:0 and they continued to win until the Upper Bracket Final against Team Empire, where they lost 1:2. This meant they had to win the Lower Brack Final against FaZe Clan to rematch Team Empire in the Grand Finals, which they did 2:0. After going through the North American Qualifiers to earn a place in the 2022 Six Invitational, fighting through the group stage and the playoffs, then losing in the upper bracket final, only to regain their place after a win in the lower bracket final, TSM rematch Team Empire in the Grand Finals for the 1st place prize of $1,000,000. After 4 games, 54 rounds, and 3 overtimes, TSM win the 2022 Six Invitational 3:1.

Roster

Super Smash Bros. 

In April 2015, TSM signed Super Smash Bros. Melee player Leffen as their first fighting game player. In August 2018, Leffen won Evo 2018, defeating Armada 3–0 in the grand finals to claim the trophy.
Gavin "Tweek" Demspey also joined TSM in 2019. Tweek has won multiple majors and supermajors including Smash Summit 3 and Let's Make Big Moves 2023.

Valorant
Team SoloMid acquired a Valorant team on May 22, 2020. The roster consists of Matthew "WARDELL" Yu, Yassin "Subroza" Taoufik, James "hazed" Cobb, Taylor "drone" Johnson, and Stephen “reltuC” Cutler. All of these players retired from CS:GO to compete in TSM's Valorant roster. TSM also added Braxton "brax" Pierce to their Valorant roster at the end of March 2021 and released him before July as returned to T1. The organization benched Cutler for Sean "bang" Bezerra on June 29, 2021.

The TSM roster had an explosive start in the Valorant competitive scene, gaining the top 3 places in many of the Invitational Series and Cups hosted by other teams. TSM also claimed second place in First Strike North America with a defeat against 100 Thieves. As the new year progressed, the team started in a decline from their 2020 explosive start, not making the regional finals of Masters 1 and then not making it to Masters 2 that could've got them a place in Valorant's first International LAN event. After some roster changes for the beginning of Stage 3 Challengers 1, TSM look progressively better, but was beaten by Noble, a disbanded team which they will acquire future teammate Aleko "LeviathanAG" Gabuniya. In Challengers 2, TSM rode through with close games to win the tournament and qualify for Challenger Playoffs. However, they did not make it to the second LAN event in Berlin and ended placing in the bottom 2 of 8 teams. It is now awaiting a spot to Last Chance Qualifiers to qualify for Champions if a fellow NA team wins Valorant's Berlin LAN event, as it is sitting 11th in the North American circuit point standings.

Recently, the organization announced a new all-female Valorant roster that would be added to their professional teams.

Rosters

Main

X

Academy

Apex Legends

Roster

Former divisions

Counter-Strike: Global Offensive 
TSM acquired a Danish squad in January 2015. On December 3 TSM announced the roster had been released, citing internal problems. The ex-TSM team first played under the name "Team Question Mark" until founding their own organization, Astralis. Astralis would go on to win four Majors, ELEAGUE Major Atlanta 2017 FACEIT Major London 2018, IEM Katowice 2019 Major, and StarLadder Major Berlin 2019. TSM announced a new North American roster on January 19, 2016. On March 8, 2016, TSM revealed the departure of Daniel "vice" Kim. On January 14, 2017, TSM announced the departure of their entire CS:GO roster.

Call of Duty 
Team SoloMid acquired a team to compete at 2016 CoD: World League in February 2016. The team, which took less than 2 weeks to assemble, consisted of Cole "ColeChan" Chancey, Jonathan "Pacman" Tucker, Jordan "ProoFy" Cannon, and Jamal "Whea7s" Lee. On July 7, 2016, TSM announced their withdrawal from CoD, and that the team would be going separate ways. This is due to the team's performance in the World League Stage 2. The team finished near the bottom of their rankings.

Overwatch 
Team SoloMid acquired a team on July 22, 2016. The original team consisted of Jake "torkTJO" Lepoff, Nicolas "NicolasTJO" Aubin, Joey "jkw" Wavering, Joe "Joemeister" Gramano, Jackson "Shake" Kaplan, and Anthony "harbleu" Ballo. On August 8, 2016, the whole TSM squad transfers to compLexity Gaming.

Team SoloMid has lost on Overwatch Open Tournament and BTS Overwatch Cup in 2016, and dropped their roster and Overwatch altogether on May 5, 2017.

Vainglory 
Team SoloMid acquired Team Alliance's Vainglory roster on March 10, 2016. The team, upon acquisition, composed of Michael "FlashX" Valore, Nick "CullTheMeek" Verolla and Mico "MICSHE" Dedicatoria. During their run as Team Alliance, they had won the Vainglory International Premier League, with substitute ShinKaigan filling in for iLoveJoseph, an original Team Alliance member, due to school conflicts.

Team SoloMid has won two of the past three championships since being acquired. During the 2016 Vainglory Summer Live Championships, Team SoloMid went 9–0 throughout the event, beating runner-up Hammers Velocity with a 3–0 score.

On July 19, 2018, TSM announced that it had disbanded their Vainglory division.

References

External links 

 

 

2009 establishments in California
Counter-Strike teams
Esports teams based in the United States
Hearthstone teams
League of Legends Championship Series teams
Smite (video game) teams
Super Smash Bros. player sponsors
Vainglory (video game) teams
Defunct and inactive Overwatch teams
Team SoloMid players#
Rocket League teams
Defunct and inactive Tom Clancy's Rainbow Six Siege teams
Esports teams established in 2009
Valorant teams
American Internet groups